Juan Carlos Zapata (born December 9, 1966),  is an American businessman, politician and the owner of Zapata Consulting. Founded in 2004, Zapata Consulting focuses on assisting clients in building strong relationships with public officials and community stakeholders, identifying and pursuing business opportunities, and developing strategies to strengthen a company's brand and market position. Prior to the company's inception, Mr. Zapata was involved in importing seafood, real estate and other business ventures. He also has a strong background in non-profit management.

In addition to Mr. Zapata's private sector experience, he has an extensive public service record. In 2002, he became the first Colombian American elected to serve in the Florida Legislature and was subsequently re-elected three times to Florida House of Representatives. During his time in Tallahassee, Mr. Zapata worked on a wide range of issues and developed an expertise in health care policy and budget.  He served as Chairman of the Miami-Dade Delegation from 2007 to 2010 and was appointed to Governor Rick Scott's Health and Human Services Transition Team in 2010.

Following his time in the State Legislature, Mr. Zapata was elected as a County Commissioner in 2012 and became the first Colombian-American to represent Miami-Dade County residents on the Miami-Dade County Board of Commissioners. As a Commissioner, Mr. Zapata served as the Chair of the Strategic Planning & Government Operations Committee and the Value Adjustment Board. Mr. Zapata was also a member of the Metropolitan Services Committee, the Unincorporated Municipal Service Area Committee, and the Metropolitan Planning Organization.

Mr. Zapata has served on the board for several national organizations and was the past Chair of the National Association of Latino Elected and Appointed Officials (NALEO) and the National Council of State Legislators (NCSL) Labor and Economic Development Committee. Through his chairmanship of the Miami-Dade County Hospital Governance Task Force, he contributed to the financial turnaround of one of Miami-Dade County's most important assets, Jackson Health System. As a result of his work, he has appeared in multiple media outlets and has been recognized by numerous business and community groups. These accolades include several Legislator of the Year awards and the Order of Congress of Colombia, one of Colombia's highest civilian honors.

Mr. Zapata's other public service includes various philanthropic initiatives and the creation of two non-profits that provide critical services to Miami-Dade County residents. Mr. Zapata founded Read 2 Succeed, a non-profit that offers free tutoring and provides children with access to books and supplies, and CASA, a non-profit dedicated to helping fellow immigrants integrate and contribute to the community.

Mr. Zapata attended Florida International University, where he received a bachelor's degree in Finance and International Business and was awarded the Torch Award, FIU's highest alumni recognition. Mr. Zapata also holds a master's degree in Public Administration from Harvard University’s Kennedy School of Government. Mr. Zapata currently resides in Miami, Florida.

References

External links
Miami-Dade County District 11
Florida House of Representatives Profile
Project vote Smart profile

American politicians of Colombian descent
Republican Party members of the Florida House of Representatives
Hispanic and Latino American state legislators in Florida
1966 births
Living people
Colombian emigrants to the United States
Harvard Kennedy School alumni
Florida International University alumni